This is a list of Android distributions, that is, Android-based operating systems (OS), custom firmware, or custom ROM, that are or were forked from the Android Open Source Project, have not included Google Play Services officially in some or all markets, yet maintained independent coverage in notable Android-related sources. 

Android ROM, or Android Read Only Memory, is "a file containing the executable instructions (a system image) of an Android OS and affiliated apps". Custom ROM includes both uniquely modified OS and stock ROMs created for older devices, or newer ones before their official release. The Android ROM is actually a type of flash memory, rather than Read Only memory (ROM). 

The list may include distributions that come preinstalled on a device (stock ROM) or modifications of them. Only official builds are listed.

Table

See also
ClockworkMod – custom recovery image
Comparison of mobile operating systems
F-Droid – community-maintained Software Repository for Android
MicroG – replacement for Google Play Services
Team Win Recovery Project (TWRP) – custom recovery image

Notes

References

 
Android
Google lists